John S. Case (February 15, 1823, Belgrade, Maine – May 10, 1902, Rockland, Maine) was a Republican politician from Maine who served as the Mayor of Rockland, and as a member of the Maine House of Representatives. Case was the son of Ambrose Case and Susan Sawyer. In 1852 Case married Lucy C. White, they had two children, a son and daughter.

References

Sources

1823 births
1902 deaths
Republican Party members of the Maine House of Representatives
People from Rockland, Maine
American Congregationalists
Mayors of places in Maine
Maine city council members
People from Belgrade, Maine
19th-century American politicians